Born to the Saddle is a 1953 American Western film directed by William Beaudine.

Plot
Bent on revenge for the death of his father and the theft of their ranch, young Bill Walton rides into town seeking the aid of his uncle. As he rides into town, he takes a bullet meant for gambler Matt Daggett and across the street lies his uncle, victim of the gambler's gun. Dagget looks on Bill as 'good luck' and nurses him back to health and gives him the job of training "Blue Chip", the fastest quarter horse in the west, for a big race. Bill doesn't know that Dagget plans to fix the race and put his own money on another horse at heavy odds. Quartered at the nearby ranch of John Grant, Bill meets Jerri Marshall, daughter of Bob Marshall, who lost "Blue Chip" to Daggett in a crooked gambling deal. Grant gets mixed up in a stage coach robbery and killing and rides back to the ranch with Daggett henchman Red Roper. When Roper tries to molest a woman, Bill bluffs him with an empty gun and forces him back to town. Roper is arrested for the killing and implicates Grant. Incited by Daggett, who fears exposure as the outlaw leader, a paid mob breaks into the jail and both Grant and Roper are hanged, but Grant, barely able to touch a plank with the toe of his boot, clings to life until Bill finds him and cuts him down. On the day of the race, Daggett lures Bill away from "Blue Chip" long enough for a wire to be twisted around the horse's leg at the fetlock. "Blue Chip" goes lane partly through the race but races on in agony and wins. Daggett tries to hide his treachery by blaming the lameness on a broken leg and draws his gun to shoot the horse. Marshall intervenes and is shot by the gambler. Bill discovers the wire and now also knows that Daggett is the outlaw leader responsible for his father's death and the hanging of his friend Grant. Bill heads for the saloon to confront Daggett. Just as the gambler turns to fire on Bill, Grant appears. When the smoke clears both Daggett and Grant are dead.

Cast
 Chuck Courtney as Bill Walton
 Donald Woods as Matt Daggett
 Leif Erickson as Bob Marshall
 Rand Brooks as John Grant
 Glenn Strange as Tom Roper
 Dolores Prest as Jerry Marshall
 Robert J. Anderson as Ricky Summers
 Lucille Thompson as Doris, the Saloon Girl
 Fred Kohler Jr. as Jeff Sanger
 Dan White as Sheriff
 Milton Kibbee as Dr. Granden
 Boyd Davis as Judge Trumbull
 Karen Morley as Kate Daggett
 Bill Kennedy as Bit

External links
 
 

1953 films
1953 Western (genre) films
1950s English-language films
Films directed by William Beaudine
Astor Pictures films
American Western (genre) films
1950s American films